Rong Schafer (born Rong Bo; 6 October 1985) is a Chinese female badminton player, and now represented American. She grew up in Beijing, China, and started playing badminton at aged 8. In 2009, she won the Estonian International tournament in women's doubles event.

Achievements

BWF International Challenge/Series
Women's singles

Women's doubles

Mixed doubles

 BWF International Challenge tournament
 BWF International Series tournament

References

External links
 

1985 births
Living people
Badminton players from Beijing
American sportspeople of Chinese descent
Chinese female badminton players
American female badminton players
21st-century American women